Plas Coch (also known as 24 AND 26 Well St) is a medieval Grade II Listed building in Ruthin, Denbighshire which received its listed status on 24 October 1950 by Cadw. It is of medieval origin and is a former C17 large town house. It was built in 1613 using red sandstone from the castle; it became home to the constable of the castle. The building is two-storey with attics and has four large window on each floor. In 1963 it became a banqueting hall owned by Rees Jones who used to trade at the village hall in Llanfair. It became the Conservative Club in 1977 and has been slightly altered, now offering all round facilities for functions.

It has been listed as being architecture of exceptional value for being 'a large early C17 town-house, unusual for its stone construction in this area.'

References

Grade II listed buildings in Ruthin